"Magic" is a 1974 song by Scottish pop rock band Pilot, and was the first hit single for the group. It was written by band members David Paton and Billy Lyall for their debut album, From the Album of the Same Name.

Background
According to Paton, the song is inspired by the sunrise on Blackford Hill in Edinburgh. In a 2012 interview with Hotdisc Television, Paton also stated that at the time, his wife said she'd "never seen a daybreak," which also inspired the song.

Personnel

Pilot
David Paton: Lead vocals, Bass
Billy Lyall: Keyboards, Synthesizers, Piano and Backing vocals
Stuart Tosh: Drums and Backing vocals

Additional personnel
Ian Bairnson: Electric guitar 
Nick Heath: Backing vocals
David Mason: Trumpet
Richard Hewson: Orchestral Arrangements

Chart performance
"Magic" charted most successfully in Canada, where it topped the RPM national singles chart on 19 July 1975, and received a gold certification. It climbed as far as number 11 on the UK Singles Chart and reached number five during the summer of 1975 in the US on the Billboard Hot 100.

Weekly charts

Year-end charts

Selena Gomez version 

Gomez's version was released as a single on 21 July 2009. It peaked at No. 61 on the U.S. Billboard Hot 100 chart, at No. 80 on the Canadian Hot 100 chart, at No. 5 on the Norwegian Singles Chart and at No. 90 on the UK Singles Chart. It has sold 563,000 copies in the United States. Selena Gomez covered "Magic" for the soundtrack of the Disney Channel television series Wizards of Waverly Place; it was marked with an asterisk (*) as "Magic*" due to two other songs on the album having identical names (the other two performed by Meaghan Martin and Honor Society). The song was featured in the television film Wizards of Waverly Place: The Movie.  Her music video premiered on Disney Channel on 24 July 2009. The video was directed by Roman Perez.

Usage in other media
The song was included in the films Happy Gilmore (1996), Herbie: Fully Loaded (2005), The Magic Roundabout (also 2005), Diary of a Wimpy Kid: Rodrick Rules (2011), The Incredible Burt Wonderstone (2013), and the video game Sleeping Dogs (2012). Television series include Fish Hooks, Nutri Ventures. It was also heard in a humorous deleted scene from the film Guardians of the Galaxy. It's also played on a regular basis at Tynecastle Park, when Heart of Midlothian win a game against their rivals. The song is used in the first episode of 2021's Tiger King: The Doc Antle Story when talking about Doc's use of tigers in his '70s magic shows.

See also
 List of 1970s one-hit wonders in the United States

References

External links
 Lyrics of this song
 
 

1974 singles
RPM Top Singles number-one singles
Pilot (band) songs
2009 singles
Selena Gomez songs
Songs written by David Paton
1974 songs
EMI Records singles
Walt Disney Records singles